L. Greenberg National Institute of Forensic Medicine also known as Abu Kabir Forensic Institute, is an Israeli forensic research laboratory located in the Abu Kabir neighborhood of Tel Aviv, Israel.


History
Established in 1954 as part of the Israel Police Division of Criminal Identification (today the Division of Identification & Forensic Science), the Greenberg National Institute of Forensic Medicine is now a department of the Israeli Health Ministry and affiliated with the Sackler Faculty of Medicine at the University of Tel Aviv. Administratively it reports to Assaf HaRofeh Hospital.

The Abu Kabir Institute is the only facility in Israel authorized to conduct autopsies in cases of unnatural death. The lab at Abu Kabir conducts forensic examination in cases of rape, homicide, suicide and suspicious death. It also identifies victims of terror attacks.

Organ removal allegations

In 2005, the then chief pathologist Yehuda Hiss, director of Abu Kabir from 1988 to 2004, admitted, as part of a plea bargain, to the unauthorized removal of organs, bone and tissue from 125 bodies in the 1990s. Israel said that such activity stopped in 2000 .

In 2009, Abu Kabir was mentioned in a controversial article in Swedish tabloid Aftonbladet by Donald Boström. Boström accused the institute of being part of a human organ trafficking ring in which Israel Defense Forces (IDF) soldiers abducted Palestinians to "harvest" their organs.

Boström later admitted having no evidence. "I have a personal opinion," Boström told Israel Radio. "It concerns me to the extent that I want it to be investigated. But whether it's true or not - I have no idea, I have no clue." In an interview with an Israeli newspaper, Boström said his allegations were based on hearsay: "What I experienced during this day is many people from Israel who called me haven't read the article. So they think I'm accusing the IDF of stealing organs. That's not what I'm doing. I just recorded the Palestinian families saying that."

The Israeli Ministry of Health later acknowledged that "skin, corneas, heart valves and bones" had been removed during autopsies of Israelis, including IDF soldiers, Palestinians and foreign workers in the 1990s. The ministry says that for the past decade, procedures carried out at Abu Kabir have conformed with ethics and Jewish law, and all organ removal is done with permission.

Nancy Scheper-Hughes, a professor of anthropology at the University of California-Berkeley who founded Organs Watch, an organization that monitors traffic in human organs, said she decided to publicize an interview with Hiss in the wake of the Aftonbladet affair. She described the involvement of the IDF as a "widely-known secret in Israel." However, Scheper-Hughes made it clear she does not believe Israel murdered Palestinians for organs.

The Attorney General of Israel dropped criminal charges against Hiss. He was fired in 2012 and replaced by Dr. Chen Kugel.

References

Medical research institutes in Israel
Pathology organizations
Forensics organizations
Organizations based in Tel Aviv
1954 establishments in Israel
Organizations established in 1954